Kufr Rakeb (Arabic: كفر راكب) is a town in Irbid Governorate in Jordan. It is one of the five metropolitan districts of Barqash.

Geography
Located in the south western region of Irbid Governorate, Kufr Rakeb is one of the five metropolitan districts that make up the municipality of Barqash. It is situated close to the Jordan Valley, and administratively belongs to the Kourah Department.

History
In 1838 Kufr Rakeb's inhabitants were predominantly Sunni Muslims.

The Jordanian census of 1961 found 662 inhabitants in Kufr Rakib.

Population
The town of Kufr Rakeb, has an estimated population of 5,000 (2011). It is the center of the municipality of Barqash, which has a population of about 45,000 (2011). The town is mainly agricultural.

See also
 Kufor–Rakeb syndrome

References

Bibliography

 

Villages in Irbid governorate